German submarine U-331 was a Type VIIC U-boat of Nazi Germany's Kriegsmarine during World War II, famous for sinking the battleship HMS Barham.

The submarine was laid down on 26 January 1940 at the Nordseewerke yard at Emden, launched on 20 December 1940, and commissioned on 31 March 1941 under the command of Oberleutnant zur See  Hans-Diedrich Freiherr von Tiesenhausen. She was tracked by the RAF and crippled before being destroyed by the Royal Navy Fleet Air Arm on 17 November 1942 with the loss of most of her crew.

Design
German Type VIIC submarines were preceded by the shorter Type VIIB submarines. U-331 had a displacement of  when at the surface and  while submerged. She had two shafts and two  propellers.

U-331 was fitted with five  torpedo tubes (four fitted at the bow and one at the stern), fourteen torpedoes, one  SK C/35 naval gun, 220 rounds, and a  C/30 anti-aircraft gun. The boat had a complement of between forty-four and sixty.

Service history

First patrol
U-331s first patrol took her from Kiel in Germany on 2 July 1941, out into the mid-Atlantic, before arriving at Lorient in France on 19 August.

Second patrol
She sailed from Lorient on 24 September and headed into the Mediterranean Sea. There on 10 October she engaged three British tank landing craft off Sidi Barrani, Egypt. After missing with a torpedo, she engaged with her deck gun, slightly damaging HMS TLC-18 (A 18), before breaking off the attack after being hit by 40 mm shells, which wounded two men (one fatally) and damaged the conning tower. She arrived at Salamis, Greece, the next day, 11 October.

Third patrol-HMS Barham
 Sailing from Salamis on 12 November 1941, U-331 returned to the Egyptian coast. On 17 November she landed seven men of the Lehrregiment Brandenburg east of Ras Gibeisa, on a mission to blow up a railway line near the coast, which failed. On 25 November 1941, north of Sidi Barrani, U-331 fired three torpedoes into the British  . As the ship rolled over, her magazines exploded and she quickly sank with the loss of 861 men, while 395 were rescued. U-331 returned to Salamis on 3 December, where her commander, Freiherr Hans-Diedrich von Tiesenhausen, was subsequently promoted to Kapitänleutnant and awarded the Knight's Cross of the Iron Cross.

Fourth and fifth patrol
U-331 left Salamis on 14 January 1942 for another patrol off the Egyptian coast, this time with no success. She then sailed for La Spezia, Italy, arriving on 28 February.

Her next patrol was the reverse of the previous one, she left La Spezia on 4 April, patrolled the enemy coast, then returned to Salamis on 19 April.

Sixth to ninth patrol
Her next four patrols were similarly uneventful, operating from Messina, Sicily, and then La Spezia again, from May to September 1942, patrolling the North African coast without success.

Tenth patrol
U-331 departed La Spezia on her final voyage on 7 November 1942 to attack the massed ships of "Operation Torch". The Leedstown had landed troops on the night of 7/8 November, and the next day had been hit by an aerial torpedo from a Ju 88 torpedo bomber of III./KG 26 destroying her steering gear and flooding the after section. U-331 fired a spread of four torpedoes at the ship hitting her with two. Leedstown settled by the bow with a heavy starboard list, and was abandoned, finally sinking two hours later.

On 13 November U-331 was attacked by an escort ship and was slightly damaged when she dived too deep and hit the sea bed.

Sinking
U-331 was sunk on 17 November, north of Algiers in position . She had been badly damaged after being attacked by a Lockheed Hudson bomber of No. 500 Squadron RAF, with the forward hatch jammed open, preventing the submarine from diving, and she signalled surrender to the Hudson. The destroyer  was ordered to seize the submarine, but an airstrike by three Fairey Albacore torpedo-bombers from 820 Naval Air Squadron escorted by two Grumman Martlet fighters of 893 Naval Air Squadron was launched from the British aircraft carrier  against the damaged submarine. Unaware of any surrender signals, the Martlets strafed U-331 which was then sunk by a torpedo dropped from one of the Albacores. Of her crew 32 were killed and 17 survived, including her commander.

Wolfpacks
U-331 took part in one wolfpack, namely:
 Goeben (24 – 30 September 1941)

Summary of raiding history

See also
 Mediterranean U-boat Campaign (World War II)

References

Notes

Citations

Bibliography

 Hodgson, Bill. "The Sinking of U-331". Aeroplane Monthly, March 1994, Vol 22 No 3. pp. 11–14.

External links

German Type VIIC submarines
U-boats commissioned in 1941
World War II submarines of Germany
World War II shipwrecks in the Mediterranean Sea
U-boats sunk in 1942
U-boats sunk by British aircraft
1940 ships
Ships built in Emden
Maritime incidents in November 1942